An alternate reality game (ARG) is an interactive narrative that uses the real world as a platform, often involving multiple media and game elements, to tell a story that may be affected by participants' ideas or actions.



List

Media with ARG themes or elements

Television 
 Dispatches from Elsewhere
 Westworld
 The OA

Films 
The Game
Existenz
The Dark Knight
Cloverfield
The Cloverfield Paradox
Super 8
Devour
10 Cloverfield Lane
The Blair Witch Project
The Institute
The Last Broadcast
Ready Player One
The Batman (2022 film)

Short films 
 This House Has People in It
 Unedited Footage of a Bear

Books 
 Pattern Recognition by William Gibson
 Penny Dreadful by Will Christopher Baer
 Halting State by Charles Stross
 Little Brother by Cory Doctorow
 Cathy's Book and Cathy's Key by Sean Stewart, Jordan Weisman, and Cathy Brigg (illustrator)
 John Dies at the End by David Wong
 Mr. Mercedes by Stephen King
 Ready Player One by Ernest Cline
 This Is Not a Game by Walter Jon Williams
 Strange Flesh by Michael Olson
 The Secret: A Treasure Hunt by Byron Preiss

Webseries 
 Marble Hornets
 Alantutorial
 Ben Drowned
 Local 58
 everymanhybrid
 The Sun Vanished

Music 

 No Love Deep Web by Death Grips
 Tomorrow's Harvest by Boards of Canada
 Year Zero by Nine Inch Nails

References 

alternate reality games
Immersive entertainment